Crave Entertainment was an American video game publisher founded in 1997 by Nima Taghavi. Its headquarters was in Newport Beach, California. It was acquired by Handleman Company in 2005 in a deal valued up to $95,000,000 but was then sold to Fillpoint LLC in early 2009 for only $8,100,000 due to Handleman's bankruptcy and pending liquidation. During its lifetime it published games for Dreamcast, Wii, Nintendo DS, Game Boy Advance, Nintendo 64, GameCube, PlayStation, PlayStation 2, PlayStation 3, PSP, Xbox, and Xbox 360. Crave mainly focused on budget titles, and imported games such as Tokyo Xtreme Racer series.

On August 15, 2012, Fillpoint LLC filed for Chapter 11 Bankruptcy, with Crave ceasing operations.

List of video games published by Crave Entertainment

Cancelled games
H20verdrive
Jeanette Lee's Virtual Pool
Man vs. Wild (DS and PSP versions)
Pilot Academy
Powershot Pinball
Pro Bull Riders: Out of the Chute (Xbox 360 version)
Project Cairo (Nintendo 64 DD, developed by Craveyard)
Savage Safari Hunt
SnoCross 2 Featuring Blair Morgan (Xbox version)
Supershot Golf Robot
Jet Ion GP (released in Europe in 2002, the U.S. release was cancelled)
The Lost (PAL regions only)
UFC: Tapout (Dreamcast version)
World Championship Poker All In
Wave Runner (Dreamcast version)

References

External links
Crave Entertainment official website (archive)

Companies based in Newport Beach, California
Video game companies established in 1997
Video game companies disestablished in 2012
Defunct video game companies of the United States
Companies that filed for Chapter 11 bankruptcy in 2012
Video game publishers
Defunct companies based in Greater Los Angeles
1997 establishments in California
2012 disestablishments in California